Louis Darling, Jr. (April 26, 1916 – January 21, 1970) was an American illustrator, writer, and environmentalist, best known for illustrating the  Henry Huggins series and other children's books written by Beverly Cleary. He and his wife Lois provided illustrations for the first edition of Silent Spring.

Biography
Darling was born in Stamford, Connecticut, and would live in Connecticut for most of his life. He attended the Grand Central School of Art in New York City. After graduation and two years of private study, he worked at an agency for a time before enlisting in the Army Air Force in 1942. He served in the Air Force as a photographer for four years.

He married zoologist and artist Lois MacIntyre in 1946. They would remain married until his death, and frequently collaborated on both writing and illustration. They had no children. His mother-in-law, Grace, was a painter as well.

Also in 1946, Darling was hired by William Morrow and Company to illustrate Roderick Haig-Brown's book A River Never Sleeps. Subsequently, he began illustrating, and then writing, children's books, mostly for Morrow. He was assigned to Beverly Cleary's first book, Henry Huggins, in 1950, which began his best-known association; he would illustrate most of Cleary's books until his death. The character of Huggins was called a "modern Tom Sawyer" in the 1950s.

He wrote his first book, Greenhead, in 1954. He would later write: "I started to write my own books because it seemed to me that there was seldom enough cooperation between author and illustrator. The best way to get this cooperation was to become the author myself."

In 1962, the Darlings' friend Roger Tory Peterson suggested to Rachel Carson that they be hired to illustrate her forthcoming book, Silent Spring. Their illustrations would be used on the chapter headings and the title page of the first edition.

Darling wrote and illustrated The Gull's Way, a book about American herring gulls on an island in Maine, which was published in 1965. To research it, he had camped alone on the uninhabited island for six weeks, observing and photographing the gulls. The book won the John Burroughs Medal in 1966.

His final collaboration with Lois was A Place in the Sun: Ecology and the Living World, published in 1968.  Darling died of cancer in 1970 with Cleary dedicating her book Runaway Ralph to him.

Environmental activism
Darling had been interested in nature and the outdoors his entire life, and was an early environmentalist and conservationist. He was the president of Connecticut Conservationists, a consortium of environmentalist groups formed to oppose the dredging of Long Island Sound for the Connecticut Turnpike. The organization unsuccessfully sued the state of New York in 1956 to prevent the action, although they were successful in reducing the size of a planned parking lot that was to be built in a Connecticut salt marsh.

Awards
 1966: John Burroughs Medal, for The Gull's Way

Published books

As writer and illustrator

As illustrator only

References

External links
 Louis Darling papers at the University of Minnesota
 
 "Darling, Louis" at WorldCat – distinct from the page linked below (merge needed as of January 2015)

1916 births
1970 deaths
American children's writers
American conservationists
American children's book illustrators
John Burroughs Medal recipients
Writers from Stamford, Connecticut
Writers who illustrated their own writing
United States Army Air Forces personnel of World War II